MFK Snina is a Slovak football team, based in the town of Snina. The club was founded in 1927.

Clubname history 
1927 – ŠK Snina
1945 – Sokol Snina
1948 – Drevokombinát Snina
1951 – Kovo Snina
1952 – Spartak Snina
1955 – Spartak Vihorlat Snina
1991 – FC Vihorlat Snina
1995–present – MFK Snina

Current squad

Notable players
Had international caps for their respective countries. Players whose name is listed in bold represented their countries while playing for MFK.
  	
Past (and present) players who are the subjects of Wikipedia articles can be found here.

	
	
 Pavol Diňa
 Ondrej Duda
 Ján Mucha

References

External links 

 

Snina
Association football clubs established in 1927
1927 establishments in Slovakia